Shootenanny!  is the fifth studio album by American rock band Eels, released in 2003 by record label DreamWorks.

Background 
While lead singer Mark Oliver "E" Everett was working on the double disc Blinking Lights and Other Revelations project, he had the idea to make a "succinct, direct and no bullshit" record, inspired by the writing style of blues singer-songwriter Muddy Waters.

Before the recording of the album, Everett and drummer Jonathan Norton were in conflict. Norton left Eels after a Last Call with Carson Daly performance during the Souljacker tour, later telling a journalist his decision was "a business thing". However, he participated in the recording sessions for Shootenanny!, working as a freelancer rather than a member of the band, with tensions still intact. This would be the last album with new recordings from Norton, although earlier sessions featuring him would appear on the Blinking Lights album two years later.

Recording of the album took place for 10 days during late November 2002 with minimal production. The album was recorded onto two-inch tape and edited digitally using Pro Tools. Shootenanny! was recorded and mixed by Greg Collins, who recorded "Climbing to the Moon" on Electro-Shock Blues.

Title

The album's name comes from a neologism, coined by Everett, for "a social gathering at which participants engage in folk singing and sometimes dancing [a hootenanny], but mostly the shooting of guns."

Release 

"Saturday Morning" was released as a promotional single with the B-sides "Her", "Waltz of the Naked Clowns", and "Sad Foot Sign".

Shootenanny! was released on June 3, 2003 by record label DreamWorks. The album peaked at number 145 on the Billboard 200, the first album to chart since Beautiful Freak in 1996.

Critical reception 

Shootenanny! received a generally favorable response, though some critics were divided.

Greg Kot of Entertainment Weekly called the album "downright moving at its best". A negative review came from Chris Dahlen of Pitchfork, who wrote: "Musically and lyrically, E is spent – out of ideas, out of innovation, unable to cough up anything but by-the-numbers pop in the fourteen originals he wrote for this disc." Dom Passantino of Stylus opined that the album "suffers from a lack of identity".

Track listing 

All songs written by E, except as noted.

 "All in a Day's Work" (E, Koool G Murder) – 3:24
 "Saturday Morning" (E, Koool G Murder) – 2:55
 "The Good Old Days" – 3:03
 "Love of the Loveless" – 3:32
 "Dirty Girl" – 2:41
 "Agony" – 3:07
 "Rock Hard Times" (E, Joe Gore) – 4:00
 "Restraining Order Blues" – 3:11
 "Lone Wolf" – 2:37
 "Wrong About Bobby" – 2:46
 "Numbered Days" (E, Gore) – 3:44
 "Fashion Awards" – 3:07
 "Somebody Loves You" – 3:02

Personnel 
Eels
 Butch – drums and percussion
 E – vocals, guitar, keyboards, production
 Lisa Germano – violin
 Joe Gore – guitar, programming
 Koool G. Murder – bass guitar

Additional musicians
 Scott Gordon
 James King – saxophone
 Todd Simon – trumpet

Technical personnel
 Ryan Boesch – programming, engineering, mixing
 Greg Burns – engineering
 Greg Collins – programming, engineering, mixing
 Autumn deWilde – sleeve photography
 Bernie Grundman – mastering
 Dan Hersch – mastering
 Francesca Restrepo – sleeve art direction

Charts

In popular culture 
The song "Agony" was used on the soundtrack of the SyFy TV show Stargate Universe in the 17th episode of the first season.

References

External links 

 Shootenanny! page from Eels' website

2003 albums
Albums produced by Mark Oliver Everett
DreamWorks Records albums
Eels (band) albums